The 2007 NatWest Pro 40 league season was a 40 over English county cricket competition; colloquially known as the Sunday League. Worcestershire Royals won the League for the fourth time.

Final standings

Division One

Division two

References 

Pro40
NatWest Group